These are the results of the boxing competition at the 1924 Summer Olympics in Paris.  Medals were awarded in eight weight classes. The competitions were held from 15 to 20 July.

Medal summary

Participating nations
A total of 181 boxers from 27 nations competed at the Paris Games:

Medal table

References

External links
 International Olympic Committee medal database

 
1924 Summer Olympics events
1924
1924 in boxing
Boxing in France